Königsberg-class cruiser may refer to one of several German cruiser classes:

 , four ships built between 1905 and 1907
 , four cruisers built during World War I to replace the original Königsberg class, all four ships having been sunk or decommissioned
 , also known as the K class, a class of three light cruisers built between the two World Wars

Cruiser classes
Cruisers of Germany